Romuald Marie (born 19 May 1988) is a French footballer who plays as a defender for Trélissac .

Club career
Trained as a youth with Strasbourg and Rennes, Marie spent two seasons with Cannes in the third tier, where he made over 50 league appearances. He signed for Red Star for the first time in October 2010.

Marie spent two seasons back at the third tier with Poiré-sur-Vie, before returning to Red Star in the summer of 2013. He helped Red Star gain promotion to Ligue 2 during the 2014–15 Championnat National season, and signed professional terms with the club in June 2015. He made his professional debut for the club on 1 December 2015 in a 3–1 win against FC Metz.

In July 2016 Marie made the move across Paris to sign for Paris FC. He stayed in the Championnat National the following season with Les Herbiers. At Les Hebiers he was part of the team that played in the 2018 Coupe de France Final.

In June 2019, Marie signed for Annecy FC.

References

External links
 

Living people
1988 births
Association football defenders
French footballers
Ligue 2 players
Championnat National players
Championnat National 2 players
Championnat National 3 players
AS Cannes players
Red Star F.C. players
Vendée Poiré-sur-Vie Football players
Paris FC players
Les Herbiers VF players
FC Annecy players
Trélissac FC players
People from Longjumeau
Footballers from Essonne